Herculia is a genus of moths belonging to the family Pyralidae. The genus is mostly treated as a synonym of Hypsopygia. If considered valid, some species previously placed here are now in Dolichomia and Ocrasa, which in turn are also mostly merged in Hypsopygia. O. fulvocilialis is sometimes still placed in the present genus.

Species
Species include:

 Herculia decoloralis (Lederer, 1863)
 Herculia incarnatalis (Zeller, 1847)
 Herculia pernigralis (Ragonot, 1891)
 Herculia rubidalis (Denis & Schiffermüller, 1775)
 Herculia tabidalis (Warren, 1891)
 Herculia nigrivitta (Walker, 1863)

Footnotes

References
  (2009): Markku Savela's Lepidoptera and some other life forms – Herculia. Version of 2009-APR-08. Retrieved 2010-APR-12.

Pyralini
Pyralidae genera